"Moth" / "Wolf Cub" is a collaborative release by the British musicians Burial and Four Tet. It was released exclusively on vinyl on 4 May 2009 by Hebden's own Text Records imprint. The limited-run 12" vinyl had no label and was packaged in a completely black sleeve without liner notes. Neither the artists nor the record label have released any information about the single's content or production, save for the artists and track names.

This record was repressed in November 2011.

Track listing

References
 General

 

 Specific

2009 singles
Burial (musician) songs
Four Tet albums
Text Records singles